The Lancia 15/20HP (Type 54, Beta) is an automobile which was produced by Lancia of Italy in 1909.

The 15/20HP replaced the earlier 12HP-Alfa and 18/24HP Dialfa models. Basically the car was a modernized version of the 12HP with the engine displacement

References
Lancia by Michael Frostick, 1976. 

Beta-15 20HP
Cars introduced in 1909
Brass Era vehicles